The 39th Annual TV Week Logie Awards was held on Sunday 18 May 1997 at the Crown Palladium in Melbourne, and broadcast on the Nine Network. The ceremony was hosted by Daryl Somers, and guests included Patrick Stewart, Daniel Davis, Laura Innes, David James Elliott, Michael T. Weiss and Ben Elton.

Winners

Gold Logie
Most Popular Personality on Australian Television
Winner:
Lisa McCune in Blue Heelers (Seven Network)

Acting/Presenting

Most Popular Actor
Winner:
Martin Sacks in Blue Heelers (Seven Network)

Most Popular Actress
Winner:
Lisa McCune in Blue Heelers (Seven Network)

Most Outstanding Actor
Winner:
Colin Friels in Water Rats (Nine Network)

Most Outstanding Actress
Winner:
Alison Whyte in Frontline (ABC TV)

Most Popular Light Entertainment Personality
Winner:
Daryl Somers in Hey Hey It's Saturday (Nine Network)

Most Popular Comedy Personality
Winner:
Eric Bana in Full Frontal (Seven Network)

Most Popular New Talent
Winner:
Tasma Walton in Blue Heelers (Seven Network)

Most Popular Programs

Most Popular Series
Winner:
Blue Heelers (Seven Network)

Most Popular Light Entertainment Program
Winner:
Hey Hey It's Saturday (Nine Network)

Most Popular Comedy Program
Winner:
Full Frontal (Seven Network)

Most Popular Public Affairs Program
Winner:
A Current Affair (Nine Network)

Most Popular Lifestyle or Information Program
Winner:
Better Homes and Gardens (Seven Network)

Most Popular Sports Program
Winner:
The AFL Footy Show (Nine Network)

Most Popular Sports Event
Winner:
1996 Atlanta Olympic Games (Seven Network)

Most Popular Children's Program
Winner:
Agro's Cartoon Connection (Seven Network)

Most Outstanding Programs

Most Outstanding Achievement in Drama Production
Winner:
Water Rats (Nine Network)

Most Outstanding Achievement in Public Affairs
Winner:
"The Prisoners Who Waited", Sunday (Nine Network)

Most Outstanding Documentary
Winner:
Somebody Now – Nobody's Children Seven Years On (ABC TV)

Most Outstanding Achievement in News
Winner:
"Port Arthur Massacre", ABC News (ABC TV)

Most Outstanding Achievement in Comedy
Winners:
Club Buggery (ABC TV)

Most Outstanding Achievement in Sport
Winners:
1996 Atlanta Olympic Games – Kieren Perkins 1500m Victory (Seven Network)

Performers
Human Nature

Hall of Fame
After a lifetime in Australian television, Garry McDonald became the 14th inductee into the TV Week Logies Hall of Fame.

References

External links
 

1997
1997 television awards
1997 in Australian television